The Order of the House of Osman was an order of the Ottoman Empire founded on 31 August 1893 by Sultan Abdul Hamid II. It was awarded to senior male and female members of the Imperial family and foreign heads of state. The order was awarded in only in one grade.

Description
The order consisted of a badge. It was an oval medallion in gold, with the tughra of Sultan Abdul Hamid, and the inscriptions "Relying on the Assistance of Almighty God" above and "Sovereign of the Ottoman Empire" below the tughra. Surrounding the center medallion is a red enameled ring bearing the dates AH 699 and AH 1311 (1299 AD, the date of the founding of the Ottoman Empire, and 1895 AD, the date of the founding of the order). At the bottom of the medallion is a spray of laurel leaves in white enamel, and around the top a bow in white enamel, topped by a white enameled crescent and star suspension. The badge could be worn either from a collar composed of red enameled plaques bearing white crescents and stars, or from a wide bow ribbon of red and white diagonal stripes, with a short enameled gold chain similar to the collar around the center of the ribbon. The ribbon bow was to be worn only when no ribbons or sashes of other orders were worn simultaneously.

Recipients
Ottoman recipients
Ahmet Tevfik Pasha
Abdulmejid II

Foreign recipients
Edward VII
Abbas II of Egypt

References

Orders, decorations, and medals of the Ottoman Empire